Nachtigal may refer to:
 Nachtigal Falls, waterfalls on the Sanaga River, Cameroon
 Nachtigal Glacier
 Nachtigal Peak

Family name 
 Gustav Nachtigal, German explorer
Jacob M. Nachtigal, American architect, of Omaha, Nebraska

See also 
 Nachtigall

German-language surnames